This is a list of rivers of Yukon.

Arctic Ocean watershed
Mackenzie River watershed
Upper Liard River
Rancheria River
Little Rancheria River
Frances River
Hyland River
Coal River
La Biche River
Beaver River (Liard River tributary)
Whitefish River
Kotaneelee River
Smith River
South Nahanni River
Peel River
Ogilvie River
Blackstone River
Hart River
Wind River
Bonnet Plume River
Snake River
Firth River
Malcolm River
Trail River
Babbage River
Blow River
Clarence River

Bering Sea watershed
Yukon River 
Marsh Lake
McClintock Creek
Tagish River
Tagish Lake
Bennett Lake
Atlin Lake
Nares River
Little Atlin Lake
Partridge River
Teslin River
Teslin Lake
Nisutlin River
Wolf Rover
Dän Tàgé
Morley River
Takhini River
Kusawa Lake
Swift River
Big Salmon River
Quiet Lake
Nordenskiold River
Pelly River
Hoole River
Ross River
South MacMillan River
Macmillan River
Stewart River
Beaver River (Stewart River)
Hess River
McQuesten River
Scroggie Creek
White River
Donjek River
Kluane River
Kluane Lake
Slims River
Nisling River
Sixtymile River
Miller Creek
Indian River
Klondike River
Bonanza Creek
Eldorado Creek 
Fortymile River
Porcupine River
Miner River
Fishing Branch
Bell River
Rock River
Eagle River
Old Crow River
Bluefish River
Rapid River
Kandik River

Pacific Ocean watershed
Alsek River
Kaskawulsh River
Jarvis River
Dezadeash River
Aishihik River or Canyon Creek
Tatshenshini River
Klukshu River
Blanchard River (Yukon)

Alphabetical list

Aishihik River or Canyon Creek
Alsek River
Babbage River
Beaver River (Liard River tributary)
Beaver River (Stewart River)
Big Salmon River
Blackstone River
Blow River
Bluefish River
Bonnet Plume River
Clarence River
Coal River
Dezadeash River
Donjek River
Eagle River
Firth River
Fishing Branch
Fortymile River
Hart River
Hess River
Holbrook Creek
Hoole River
Hyland River
Indian River
Jarvis River
Kandik River
Kaskawulsh River
Klondike River
Kluane River
Klukshu River
Kotaneelee River
La Biche River
Liard River
Little Rancheria River
Malcolm River
McCabe Creek
McClintock Creek
McQuesten River
Macmillan River
Miller Creek
Moose Creek (Yukon)
Morley River
Nares River
Nisling River
Nisutlin River
Nordenskiold River
Ogilvie River
Old Crow River
Partridge River
Peel River
Pelly River
Porcupine River
Rapid River
Rosebud Creek
Ross River
Scroggie Creek
Sixtymile River
Slims River
Smith River
South MacMillan River
South Nahanni River
Stewart River
Swift River
Tagish River
Takhini River
Tatshenshini River
Teslin River
Trail River
White River
Whitefish River
Wind River
Wolf River
Yukon River

See also 
List of rivers of Canada
List of rivers of the Americas

Yukon

Rivers